The Cuban evening bat (Nycticeius cubanus) is a species of bat in the vesper bat family, Vespertilionidae, that is endemic to western Cuba. It is a small bat, even smaller than cogener Nycticeius humeralis. It is insectivorous, but otherwise little is known about its behavior and diet.

References

Nycticeius
Taxa named by Juan Gundlach
Bats of the Caribbean
Endemic fauna of Cuba
Mammals of Cuba
Mammals described in 1861
Near threatened animals